The Solicitor General of Canada was a position in the Canadian ministry from 1892 to 2005. The position was based on the Solicitor General in the British system and was originally designated as an officer to assist the Minister of Justice. It was not initially a position in the Canadian Cabinet, although after 1917 its occupant was often sworn into the Queen's Privy Council for Canada and attended Cabinet meetings. In 1966, the modern position of Solicitor General was created with the repeal of the previous Solicitor General Act and the passage of a new statute creating the ministerial office of the Solicitor General of Canada.

In recent decades the Solicitor General's department was responsible for administering the prison system, the Royal Canadian Mounted Police, the National Parole Board and other matters relating to internal security. In 2003, the position was styled Minister of Public Safety and Emergency Preparedness, and the portfolio expanded.  In 2005, the position of Solicitor General was formally abolished.

Solicitors General
 

(*) Not in Cabinet

References

 
Canadian ministers
Canada